Alessandro D'Alatri (born 24 February 1955) is an Italian film director, screenwriter  and former actor.
 
Born in Rome, as a teenager D'Alatri was active as a stage and film actor and worked with  Luchino Visconti, Giorgio Strehler, Vittorio De Sica among others. In 1970s he decided to focus on directing, and after  a long apprenticeship as a director of commercials, that led him to be awarded for best AD director at the 1987 Cannes Lions International Festival of Creativity, in 1991 he directed a first feature film, Americano rosso, for which he won the  David di Donatello for Best New Director.  The following No Skin was both a critical and a commercial success, and gave D'Alatri a David di Donatello, a Nastro d'Argento and a Ciak d'oro for best screenplay. His 1998 film The Garden of Eden, an apocryphal history of Jesus, was entered into the main competition at the 59th Venice International Film Festival.

Filmography 
 1991: Americano rosso
 1994: No Skin  
 1998: The Garden of Eden 
 2002: Casomai
 2005: The Fever 
 2006: Commediasexi
 2010: Sul mare

References

External links 
 
 

1955 births
Italian screenwriters
Writers from Rome
Film directors from Rome
Italian male film actors
Living people
Male actors from Rome
Italian male screenwriters
Ciak d'oro winners